Khodynka (Khodynskiy), officially Frunze Central Aerodrome, often referred to as Tsentralny, was an airport in Moscow, Russia, located northwest of the centre of the city.

History

The founding of the aerodrome took place on June 17, 1910 when the  announced that the staff of the Moscow Military District had approved the allocation of land in the territory of Khodynka field as an airfield. Donations from aviation enthusiasts met much of the cost of the construction of the facility. There resulted a runway and six small hangars for aeroplanes. The official opening took place on October 3, 1910 in the presence of military authorities and of many Russian aviators.  made the first takeoff.

In 1920 the Scientific-Test Airfield NOA GU RKKVF, which was to become today's 929th State Flight Test Centre named for V. P. Chkalov, was established at the airfield. 

On May 3, 1922 the first ever Russian international flight on the route Moscow - Königsberg - Berlin took place. On July 15, 1923 the first regular domestic passenger flights between Moscow and Nizhny Novgorod started - the 420 km route took 2.5 hours in a 4-seater AK-1 monoplane.

From 1923 to 1926 the facility bore the name "Central L. D. Trotsky Aerodrome". Subsequently, it officially became "Central M. V. Frunze Aerodrome".

From 1932 to 1935, the scientific-testing institute was relocated to Chkalovsky near Shchelkovo. 

In 1938 the airport gave its name to the newly opened Moscow Metro station Aeroport to the north of the runway.

Khodynka remained the only airport in Moscow until the opening of Bykovo in 1933. (Tushino opened in 1935, Vnukovo in 1941). Passenger flights stopped in the late 1940s, from 1950s to 2003 aerodrome was used only for ferrying of new Ilyushin aircraft. 
Khodynka Aerodrome closed in 2003, and  the whole site has been redeveloped for other uses. It housed a large number of stored aircraft from Sukhoi and Mikoyan-Gurevich, which were moved to Lukhovitsy.

External links 

 Video report from the abandoned aircraft museum, 2009

Defunct airports
Airports built in the Russian Empire
Airports in Moscow
Airports disestablished in 2003